Tupinambis cryptus, the cryptic golden tegu, is a species of lizard in the family Teiidae. It is found in Venezuela, French Guiana, Guyana, Suriname, Brazil, Colombia and Trinidad and Tobago.

References

Tupinambis
Reptiles described in 2016
Taxa named by John C. Murphy
Taxa named by Michael J. Jowers
Taxa named by Richard M. Lehtinen
Taxa named by Stevland P. Charles
Taxa named by Guarino R. Colli
Taxa named by Ayrton K. Péres, Jr.
Taxa named by Catriona R. Hendry
Taxa named by Robert Alexander Pyron